Raymond V. Darby (December 11, 1896 – March 5, 1953) was an American politician that served on the Los Angeles County Board of Supervisors from 1944 until his death. He was the Mayor of Inglewood, California for fourteen years.

Biography
Raymond Vern Darby was born in Washington, Kansas on December 11, 1896. In 1944, he was elected to the Los Angeles County Board of Supervisors and re-elected in 1946, 1948, 1950 and again in 1952.  On March 5, 1953, he was struck in the Board of Supervisors hearing room by an irate property owner and died later that day from a brain hemorrhage.

Prior to serving on the Los Angeles County Board of Supervisors.

He can be heard as a contestant on the 20th June 1951 edition of You Bet Your Life.

References

1896 births
1953 deaths
Mayors of Inglewood, California
Los Angeles County Board of Supervisors
People from Washington County, Kansas
20th-century American politicians